Liz: The Elizabeth Taylor Story is a 1995 American made-for-television biographical film chronicling the life of British-American actress Elizabeth Taylor, directed by Kevin Connor.	

The film stars Sherilyn Fenn (as Elizabeth Taylor), Katherine Helmond, Nigel Havers, Angus Macfadyen, William McNamara and Ray Wise. It originally aired in two parts on CBS on May 21 and 22, 1995.

Cast
 Sherilyn Fenn as Elizabeth Taylor
 Nigel Havers as Michael Wilding
 Katherine Helmond as Hedda Hopper
 Angus Macfadyen as Richard Burton
 William McNamara as Montgomery Clift
 Corey Parker as Eddie Fisher
 Ray Wise as Mike Todd
 Daniel McVicar as Rock Hudson
 Charles Frank as John Warner
 Michael McGrady as Larry Fortensky
 John Saxon as Richard Brooks

See also
Liz & Dick — a 2012 Lifetime biopic.
Burton & Taylor — a 2013 BBC Four bio pic.

References

External links

1995 television films
1995 films
1990s biographical films
American biographical films
Films about Elizabeth Taylor
Cultural depictions of Richard Burton
NBC network original films
Films directed by Kevin Connor
Films scored by Ken Thorne
1990s American films